Frimley railway station is in the town of Frimley in Surrey, England. The station, and all trains serving it, are operated by South Western Railway.

History
The line through Frimley is a link between the Waterloo to Reading line at Ascot and the Waterloo-Alton line at Ash Vale, although the line south from here initially joined the Woking to Basingstoke main line at Sturt Lane Junction.  The station building was built in 1877 by the London and South Western Railway to serve this line, with the link to Ash Vale being opened the following year.  The line was later electrified in 1939.  The line becomes single south of the station and remains so as far as the junction with the line from Brookwood just short of Ash Vale station.

Services
Frimley is served by trains between Ascot and Aldershot; these operate every 30 minutes Monday to Saturday, and on Sundays, services run between Ascot and Guildford.  On Mondays to Fridays, there are three trains per day that continue beyond Ascot to London Waterloo in the morning peak period, and two from London in the evening. At other times, passengers are required to change at either Ascot or Ash Vale to reach London.

Services are run using a four carriage Class 450. Two bicycles can be carried per train.

References

External links 

Railway stations in Surrey
DfT Category E stations
Former London and South Western Railway stations
Railway stations in Great Britain opened in 1878
Railway stations served by South Western Railway